John Watton is a Canadian Anglican bishop.

Watton is from Glenwood, Newfoundland and Labrador. He was educated at Queen's College, Newfoundland. Watton was a mechanic before his call to ordination. His first post was at Fortune, Newfoundland and Labrador-Lamaline.  He has also served at Gander.

References

Living people
21st-century Anglican Church of Canada bishops
People from Newfoundland (island)
Mechanics (people)
Anglican bishops of Central Newfoundland
Memorial University of Newfoundland alumni
Year of birth missing (living people)